Marvin Kirchhöfer (born 19 March 1994) is a German racing driver.

Career

Karting
Born in Leipzig, Saxony, Kirchhöfer began karting in 1999 and mainly raced in Germany, working his way up from the junior ranks (Bambini-B) to the KF2 category by 2010. In 2011, he won the German Kart Championship (KF1), winning all five final races.

ADAC Formel Masters - 2012
2012 saw his debut in the ADAC Formel Masters championship with Lotus. He was able to win the first race in Oschersleben and scored two wins from pole position at the following race weekend in Zandvoort. He finished the season with a perfect round at the Hockenheim with 2 poles, 3 fastest laps and 3 wins in the 3 races. He won the championship in his debut year with 9 wins and 329 points.

German Formula 3 - 2013
In 2013 Kirchhöfer debuted in the German Formula 3 Championship. He dominated the series, taking 25 podiums in 26 races, including 13 wins. He finished on 511 points with second place, team-mate Artem Markelov, on less than 350. His only non podium finish was a 4th place in the 2nd race of the year. He also set the fastest race lap in 17 of the races. His team Lotus won the team's championship while Kirchhöfer won the rookie cup with only 4 races not finishing as the best rookie.

GP3 Series
In 2014, Kirchhöfer debuted in the series with ART Grand Prix. He remained with the team for two seasons, finishing with two consecutive third places and accumulating six wins and fifteen podiums.

GP2 Series
In March 2016, it was announced Kirchhöfer would graduate to GP2 with Carlin.

McLaren factory driver
In 2023, Kirchhöfer embarked on a full-season campaign in the GT World Challenge Europe Endurance Cup, joining Danish drivers Benjamin Goethe and Nicolai Kjærgaard in Garage 59's Pro class entry.

Racing record

Career summary

† As Kirchhöfer was a guest driver he was ineligible to score points.

Complete ADAC Formel Masters results 
(key) (Races in bold indicate pole position) (Races in italics indicate fastest lap)

Complete German Formula Three Championship results
(key) (Races in bold indicate pole position) (Races in italics indicate fastest lap)

Complete GP3 Series results
(key) (Races in bold indicate pole position) (Races in italics indicate fastest lap)

Complete GP2 Series results
(key) (Races in bold indicate pole position) (Races in italics indicate fastest lap)

Complete Blancpain GT World Challenge Europe results
(key) (Races in bold indicate pole position) (Races in italics indicate fastest lap)

Complete British GT Championship results
(key) (Races in bold indicate pole position) (Races in italics indicate fastest lap)

† As Kirchhöfer was a guest driver he was ineligible to score points.

References

External links
 
 

1994 births
Living people
Sportspeople from Leipzig
Racing drivers from Saxony
German racing drivers
ADAC Formel Masters drivers
German Formula Three Championship drivers
German GP3 Series drivers
GP2 Series drivers
British Formula Three Championship drivers
Carlin racing drivers
ART Grand Prix drivers
ADAC GT Masters drivers
Blancpain Endurance Series drivers
Asian Le Mans Series drivers
British GT Championship drivers
Motopark Academy drivers
Fortec Motorsport drivers
R-Motorsport drivers
Jota Sport drivers
Mercedes-AMG Motorsport drivers
Aston Martin Racing drivers
21st-century German people
McLaren Racing drivers
24H Series drivers
WeatherTech SportsCar Championship drivers